Lac de Villeneuve-de-la-Raho is a lake in the town of Villeneuve-de-la-Raho in Pyrénées-Orientales, France.

History 
Considered useless, it was dried in 1854, and the land was then used for agriculture. Recovered by the General Council of the Pyrénées-Orientales, it was filled with water and became a lake once again in 1977.

References 

Villeneuve de la Raho